Tree City Sessions is a live album by American rock band Dance Gavin Dance, released on May 13, 2016, on Rise Records.

Background and recording

The band announced Tree City Sessions on March 2, 2016. The live session version of "Alex English", originally from the band's self-titled album, was released on March 31, 2016. The live album contains 12 live recorded songs performed by the band in Sacramento, California, at the Pus Cavern recording studio.

Track listing

Personnel

Dance Gavin Dance
 Tilian Pearson - clean vocals
 Jon Mess - unclean vocals
 Will Swan - guitar, backing vocals
 Tim Feerick - bass guitar
 Matt Mingus - drums, percussion

Additional musicians
 Josh Benton - guitar on tracks 1-7 and 10-12
 Martin Bianchini - guitar on tracks 8 and 9

Production
 Josh Benton – recording, mixing
 Joe Johnston – mastering

Charts

References

2016 albums
Dance Gavin Dance albums
Rise Records albums